Dance Dance Revolution, released in Europe as Dance Dance Revolution Hottest Party 4 for the Wii version and Dance Dance Revolution New Moves for other versions, is a music video game in the Dance Dance Revolution series, with this entry developed by Konami's American division. Unveiled at E3 2010, it was released for the Wii and PlayStation 3 in North America on November 16, 2010. A port of this version for the Xbox 360 was also released on April 12, 2011. It is also the only game in the series to be released for the PlayStation 3, as well as the final game in the series to be released for the Xbox 360.

Gameplay
[[File:Dance Dance Revolution (Wii video game) preview screenshot.png|200px|thumb|left|Dance Dance Revolutions choreography mode utilizes new hand motions to form dance routines.]]

Wii
While the Classic gameplay mode remains similar to previous editions, it is also accompanied by a new Choreography mode, which incorporates motions performed using the Wii Remote and Nunchuck alongside foot motions with the dance pad to form choreographed dance routines for each song. Goal-based challenges are also provided, which can allow players to earn points which unlock additional outfits and songs. As with the previous version, a mode is also provided that utilizes the Wii Balance Board.

PS3
Gameplay remains similar to previous DDR games but with additional new features, such as "Chain Arrow"a score bonus for maintaining a combo through a certain section of arrows, and "Groove Trigger", which allows the player to reduce their lifebar by 50% to increase the number of points earned for a period. The PlayStation 3 version also adds support for the PlayStation Move controller, similar to what the Hottest Party series had done with the Wii Remote; in this mode, four targets are placed around the player, which are hit with the motion controller when special diagonal arrows appear. Some songs on the Challenge difficulty also contain routines that also use the corner buttons of the dance pad along with the directional arrows.

Music
The soundtrack of Dance Dance Revolution featured more mainstream pop music spanning multiple genres, along with the original music characteristic to other entries in the series.

The following music is the song list for the PlayStation 3 version of "Dance Dance Revolution".

Music tracks highlighted in yellow represent licensed master tracks, white represents Konami original songs, and red represents Boss songs (siren will be heard while highlighting the song in game). A padlock indicates that the song has to be unlocked first.

Downloadable content
Downloadable content is only available on the PlayStation 3 version.  Each pack consists of 5 songs and costs $4.49, but the Premium pack is free.DanceDanceRevolution Greatest HitsDDR KONAMIX Greatest HitsDDRMAX2 Greatest HitsDDR SuperNOVA Greatest Hits 1DDR SuperNOVA Greatest Hits 2DDR SuperNOVA 2 Greatest HitsPREMIUM PACK'''

Reception

The Wii version of the game received mixed-to-positive reviews while the PlayStation 3 version received mixed reviews from critics.IGN gave the Wii game a 7.0 out of 10, noting that while the series was beginning to feel antiquated due to the increasing of realistic dance games such as Dance Central, the core gameplay of Dance Dance Revolution still "worked" in their opinion. Its selection of multiplayer modes were praised as good changes of pace from the classic mode, and the Choreography mode was noted as being fun and not too difficult, but panned for inaccurate motion detection and for not being as evolutionary as its competitors. Its soundtrack was considered favorable, due to its mixture of more mainstream music from the past and present along with the typical Japanese-produced music common to the series, but noted that Lady Antebellum's "Need You Now" did not fit with the overall upbeat theme of the game.Neoseeker gave the PS3 game a 3.0/10, criticizing it for a "broken" scoring system, the removal of mainstay features from recent versions (such as nonstop courses, a mission mode, doubles play, and others), the Club Mode for forcing experienced players to start at easy difficulty levels, a "hit or miss" soundtrack, and its 8-arrow mode for being "shunted" into the game, and being too confusing to play.GamesRadar+'' Carolyn Gudmundson gave the PS3 game a 2.5 out of 5, feeling that the PlayStation Move support seemed to be a tacked-on gimmick, and required awkward hand crossing to hit certain targets, comparing it to a game of Twister rather than DDR. The soundtrack was panned for containing too many pop songs, some of which unsuited for a dance game; such as "I'm Yours", jokingly believing that not even a Jason Mraz fan would think the song would fit on a dance game.

References

External links

2010 video games
Dance Dance Revolution games
Video games developed in the United States
Wii games
Wii Balance Board games
Wii MotionPlus games
PlayStation 3 games
PlayStation Move-compatible games
Xbox 360 games
Multiplayer and single-player video games